CPS3 may refer to:

 CP System III, an arcade system board 
 Carbamoyl phosphate synthetase III, an enzyme
 Parry Sound (Portage Lake) Water Aerodrome, Canadian Location Identifier CPS3